José Giorginho Aguirre Fleitas (born 23 March 1993 in Paysandú) is a Uruguayan footballer who plays for Torque.

Club career
Aguirre had a spell in Albania with Vllaznia Shkodër.

References

External links

1993 births
Living people
Footballers from Paysandú
Uruguayan footballers
Association football midfielders
Club Nacional de Football players
Miramar Misiones players
KF Vllaznia Shkodër players
Cerro Largo F.C. players
Liga I players
CSM Corona Brașov footballers
Montevideo City Torque players
Uruguayan expatriate footballers
Expatriate footballers in Romania
Uruguayan expatriate sportspeople in Romania
Expatriate footballers in Albania